Aspidoglossa striatipennis is a species of ground beetle in the subfamily Scaritinae. It was described by Gory in 1833.

References

Scaritinae
Beetles described in 1833